Eucalyptus krueseana, commonly known as book-leaf mallee, is a mallee that is endemic to inland Western Australia. It has smooth bark that is shed in ribbons, a crown of sessile, juvenile leaves, glaucous flower buds and greenish yellow flowers.

Description
Eucalyptus kruseana is a straggly mallee with smooth coppery to dark grey bark that is shed in ribbons, but rough and fibrous near the base. Adult leaves rarely develop in the crown. Greenish yellow flowers appear mainly from June to September but have been observed in February, March and May. The fruit is a barrel-shaped to cup-shaped, woody capsule.

Taxonomy and naming
Eucalyptus kruseana was first formally described by the botanist Ferdinand von Mueller in 1895 in the Australasian Journal of Pharmacy.

In 1910, Joseph Maiden described Eucalyptus morrisonii in the Journal of the Natural History and Science Society of Western Australia, but in 1920 accepted that it was the same as E. kruseana and that E. morrisonii is therefore a synonym.

The specific epithet honours John Kruse, a German born pharmacist, who worked in Melbourne.

Distribution and habitat
It has a restricted distribution on granite hills and among granite outcrops east and south east of Kalgoorlie, from Cardunia Rock north of Karonie to Binyarinyinna Rock and east of Higginsville, usually found on or near granite rock in south eastern Western Australia where it grows in sandy-loam soils.

Use in horticulture
Like most mallees the small tree forms multiple stems from a lignotuber, but in cultivation E . kruseana often forms a single stem.Book-leaf mallee is sold commercially as tube stock or in seed form. It is drought and frost tolerant and prefers a full sun position. Sold as an ornamental for small or large gardens, it is used for privacy screening, for shade, for hedging or as a feature. It can withstand hard pruning to give the plant a better shape.

See also
List of Eucalyptus species

References

krueseana
Myrtales of Australia
Trees of Australia
Eucalypts of Western Australia
Plants described in 1895
Taxa named by Ferdinand von Mueller